Line Flem Høst (born 10 November 1995) is a Norwegian competitive sailor, born in Oslo. She won a bronze medal at the 2020 Women's Laser Radial World Championship in Melbourne. She competed at the 2020 Summer Olympics in Tokyo 2021, in Laser Radial.

References

External links
 
 
 
 

 

1995 births
Living people
Sportspeople from Oslo
Norwegian female sailors (sport)
Sailors at the 2020 Summer Olympics – Laser Radial
Olympic sailors of Norway